Peter S Rogers (born 2 January 1940, in Wrexham) is a former Welsh Conservative politician, farmer and magistrate who was a Member of the Welsh Assembly (AM) for the North Wales Region from 1999 to 2003.

Education
Rogers was educated at Prenton Secondary School, Birkenhead, and then the Cheshire School of Agriculture, where he received a Credit Cert in Agriculture.

Political career
Rogers was Vice President of the Ynys Môn Conservative Association, and a member of the National Assembly for Wales for North Wales in the First Assembly (1999–2003). He was placed seventh on the North Wales regional list for the Conservative Party in the 2003 Assembly election, and stood as an Independent in Ynys Môn for the National Assembly for Wales elections in 2007. He also stood as an independent at the 2010 general election.

References

Offices held

1940 births
Living people
Councillors in Wales
Wales AMs 1999–2003
Conservative Party (UK) politicians
Independent politicians in Wales
Independent members of the Senedd